The Departure is a 2017 American documentary by Lana Wilson. It concerns suicide in Japan. The film premiered at the 2017 Tribeca Film Festival in New York. It was nominated for a 2018 Independent Spirit Award for Best Documentary.

References

External links
 
 
 

2017 films
American documentary films
Documentary films about Japan
Documentary films about suicide
Suicide in Japan
Films directed by Lana Wilson
2010s American films